The Journal of Religion and Violence is a peer-reviewed academic journal covering the study of religion and violence. It publishes analyses of contemporary and historical religious groups involved in violent incidents, as well as studies on sacrifice, terrorism, inter- and intra-religious violence, mass suicide, war and religion, and religiously-legitimated violence against women. It also publishes reviews and special issues dedicated to relevant topics. The journal is included in JSTOR's Security Studies Collection. It is indexed in the Atla Religion Database, ERIH PLUS and Index Theologicus, and has a Level 1 classification from the Publication Forum of the Federation of Finnish Learned Societies. The Journal of Religion and Violence is a hybrid open-access journal with a SHERPA/RoMEO "green" self-archiving policy. It is published by the Philosophy Documentation Center

References

External links
 

English-language journals
Religious studies journals
Publications established in 2013
Philosophy Documentation Center academic journals